Hasnain Gulamabbas Dewji (born 24 June 1957) is a Tanzanian politician who served as the Member of the Tanzanian Parliament for Kilwa South constituency from 2005 to 2010.

References

1957 births
Living people
Chama Cha Mapinduzi MPs
Tanzanian MPs 2005–2010
Shaaban Robert Secondary School alumni
Tanzanian Ismailis
Tanzanian politicians of Indian descent